The 2014 Indonesia Super League U-21 season was the sixth edition of Indonesia Super League U-21, a competition that is intended for footballers under the age of twenty-one years. The season is scheduled to begin on 12 April 2014 and ends on 19 October 2014. Unlike the previous seasons, this season's participants are the U-21 teams of 2014 Indonesia Super League teams.

Sriwijaya FC U-21 is the defending champion in this season. Semen Padang U-21 became the champion of 2014 after beating defending champion Sriwijaya FC U-21 4–0 on the final. Persipura U-21 managed to finish third after beating Mitra Kukar U-21 5–4 on penalties.

Format 
The competition is divided into four acts consist of two group stages and two knockout rounds, which is the semifinals and final. On the first stage, the teams are divided into five groups each containing four or five clubs, the top two or three teams of each group will advance to the second stage. The second stage consists of three groups containing four teams in each group, the best team from each group and the best runner-up will advance to the semifinals. The winner of the semifinals will advance to the final to battle for the championship.

Only players born on or after 1 January 1993 are eligible to compete in the tournament.

Personnel and stadium 

Note: Flags indicate national team as has been defined under FIFA eligibility rules. Managers may hold more than one non-FIFA nationality.

Note:
 All tim in Group 5 play with home tournament system at the Mandala Stadium, Jayapura.
 Persita play at the Singaperbangsa Stadium, Karawang for this season.

First stage 
First stage of the group stage will be started on 12 April 2014 to 12 June 2014. All groups will play round-robin tournament, with the exception of Group 5 which will play half round-robin tournament.

Group 1

Group 2

Group 3

Group 4

Group 5

Second stage
The second stage will be held from 1 September 2014 to 19 September 2014 where each team will play a full season in a home tournament format with two hosts for each group.

Group K will be played in Haji Agus Salim Stadium and Brawijaya Stadium. Group L will be played in Gelora 10 November Stadium and Gelora Sriwijaya Stadium. Group M will be played in Mandala Stadium and Persiba Stadium.

Group K

Group L

Group M

Ranking of runner-up teams

Knockout stage
The semi-finals and final will be played in Jalak Harupat Soreang Stadium.

Semi-finals
The matches be played on 16 October 2014.

Third-placed
The Third placed will be played on 19 October 2014.

Final
The final will be played on 19 October 2014.

Top goalscorers
Last Update: 16 October 2014

Hat-tricks

See also
2014 Indonesia Super League
2014 Liga Indonesia Premier Division

References

External links
 Official Website

 
Indonesia Super League U-21 seasons

U